A berry is a small, pulpy and often edible fruit in non-technical language. In botany, berry (botany) has a different definition: a fleshy fruit without a stone, produced from a single flower containing one ovary.

Berry may also refer to:

Places

United States
 Berry, Alabama, a town
 Berry, Kentucky, a home rule-class city
 Berry, Wisconsin, a town

Elsewhere
 Berry, France, a province of France
 Canal de Berry
 Berry, New South Wales, a town in Australia
 Berry, Quebec, a municipality in Canada
 Berry Fen, Cambridgeshire, England, a biological Site of Special Scientific Interest
 Berry Head, a coastal headland that forms the southern boundary of Tor Bay in Devon, England
 Berry Peak, highest point of Wrangel Island

People and fictional characters
 Berry (surname), a list of people
 Berry (given name), a list of people and fictional characters with the given name or nickname
 Berry (singer), stage name of French singer and actress Élise Pottier (born 1978)

Businesses
 Berry Petroleum Company, an American hydrocarbon exploration company
 Berry Global, Inc, a manufacturer and marketer of plastic packaging products
 Berry Aviation, an American charter airline

Other uses
 Hotel Berry, North Dakota, on the National Register of Historic Places
 , a Royal Navy Second World War frigate
 Berry Airfield, a former World War II airfield near Port Moresby, Papua New Guinea
 Berry College, a liberal arts college located in Mount Berry, Georgia, USA
 Berry Linux, a Live CD Linux distribution
 Berry Center of Northwest Houston, commonly known as the Berry Center, a multi-purpose sports complex in Cypress, Texas
 Berry Events Center, a multi-purpose arena in Marquette, Michigan

See also

 The Berrys, a comic strip (1942–1974)
 Berrie, a Japanese band (1985–2006)
 Barrie (disambiguation)
 Barry (disambiguation)
 Beri (disambiguation)
 Berri (disambiguation)
 Mount Berry (disambiguation)